Damien Guillon (born 1981) is a French countertenor. He is leader of the ensemble Le Banquet Celeste.

Selected discography
Solo recitals:
 JS Bach Cantatas BWV 35, BWV 170. Trio BWV 527. Maude Gratton. Le Banquet Celeste (2012) 
 John Dowland Lute songs Eric Bellocq 2012

Opera:
 Stefano Landi La Morte d'Orfeo - in the role of Fosforo.

References

1981 births
Living people
Musicians from Rennes
French countertenors
21st-century French singers
21st-century French male singers